Bilovodsk is an urban-type settlement in the Starobilsk Raion of Luhansk Oblast in the east of Ukraine on the banks of the Derkul, a tributary of the Donets with the estimated population of  Prior to 2020, it was the administrative center of the former Bilovodsk Raion. Currently, it is occupied by the Russian Army.

Climate

References 

Urban-type settlements in Starobilsk Raion
Starobilsk Raion
Starobelsky Uyezd